Shino Miyaso (宮宗 紫野 Miyasō Shino, née Shino Kumakura 熊倉 紫野, born April 23, 1988) is a Japanese women's professional shogi player ranked 2-dan.

Early life
Miyaso was born on April 23, 1988, in Koga, Ibaraki. She became interested in shogi because her father and older brother both played the game. She won the 34th  in 2002, defeating fellow future Women's professional Kana Satomi in the semi-finals.

Miyaso entered the Women's Professional Apprentice League as a student of professional shogi player Michio Takahashi in October 2002. She was promoted to rank of women's professional 2-kyū in April 2007 after obtaining her second promotion point by winning all eleven of her games in the Fall 2006 Women's Professional Apprentice League (October 2006March 2007).

Promotion history
Miyaso's promotion history is as follows.
 2-kyū: April 1, 2007
 1-kyū: April 1, 2008
 1-dan: April 1, 2009
 2-dan: July 7, 2018

Note: All ranks are women's professional ranks.

References

External links
 ShogiHub: Kumakura, Shino

Japanese shogi players
Living people
Women's professional shogi players
1988 births
People from Ibaraki Prefecture
Professional shogi players from Ibaraki Prefecture